Selakova Poljana is an uninhabited settlement in Croatia. 

Ghost towns in Croatia